Agnieszka Osiecka (9 October 1936 – 7 March 1997) was a Polish poet, writer, author of theatre and television screenplays, film director and journalist. She was a prominent Polish songwriter, having authored the lyrics to more than 2000 songs, and is considered an icon of Polish culture.

Life and career
Osiecka was born in Warsaw, the only child of Wiktor Osiecki, a pianist and composer of Serbian, Romanian-Vlach and Hungarian descent, and a scholar Maria Sztechman. She spent her early years in Zakopane where her father played the piano at the Watra Restaurant. After World War II the Osiecki family moved to Warsaw and settled in the Saska Kępa borough. The small flat soon became Osiecka’s favourite place to work. She lived there almost her entire life. After her death, the Okularnicy Foundation placed a commemorative plaque on the building.

Agnieszka was exceptionally gifted. She completed her coursework much more quickly than other students and graduated from Marie Skłodowska-Curie High School in 1952. She trained as a swimmer at Legia Sports Club and studied journalism at the University of Warsaw (1957–61) and film-directing at the prestigious National Film School in Łódź (1957–61) but dropped film-directing and started writing. Osiecka published essays and articles in the student press during her university years. She joined the famous Student Satirical Theatre (STS) in 1954 and wrote 166 political and lyrical songs for this company. She used to say "I am a journalist, that is why some of my songs are reports which rhyme." She served on the artistic board of the STS Theatre until it closed in 1972.

1962 marked her debut on Polish National Radio. Renown Polish actress Kalina Jędrusik sang Osiecka's lyrics to a hit song by Franciszka Leszczyńska called "My First Ball" (Mój pierwszy bal). One year later at the first National Festival of Polish Song in Opole in 1963 Agnieszka achieved a major success winning the main prize and six other prizes for her lyrics: "Piosenka o Okularnikach“ (music by Jarosław Abram), as well as "Białe małżeństwo,“ "Czerwony kapturek,“ "Kochankowie z ulicy Kamiennej,“ "Solo na kontrabasie“ and "Ulice wielkich miast.“

She was now recognised as a prominent young poet and the Polish National Radio offered her a job to create and lead a team to broadcast The Radio Song Studio. She also worked on theatre and television productions. Together with composer Adam Sławiński she wrote a series called "Listy śpiewające“ ("Singing Letters“). Her first major theatre show "Niech no tylko zakwitną jabłonie“ ("Let the Apple-trees Bloom") was staged at the Ateneum Theatre.

Her lyrics were set to music by such composers as Krzysztof Komeda, Seweryn Krajewski, Adam Sławiński, Zygmunt Konieczny, and others.

Personal life
Osiecka and her partner, the prominent journalist Daniel Passent, had their only child, a daughter, Agata, in 1973.

The Masurian Lake District was among Osiecka's favorite places in Poland. She liked to vacation there in the 1960s/70s with Polish intellectuals and artists. As a student she worked there for one of the local newspapers and in the autumn of her life she wrote for the Atelier Theatre in Sopot. She was a frequent visitor to the Halama writers' retreat house in Zakopane, in the Tatra Mountains.

Death and legacy
Osiecka published numerous books and released many records (see the full list at www.okularnicy.org.pl). She is considered one of the most important, prolific and gifted persons in postwar Polish culture and history. Osiecka died on 7 March 1997 after a battle of several years with  colon cancer. She is buried at the Powązki Cemetery in Warsaw.

The Agnieszka Osiecka Okularnicy Foundation was founded by her daughter shortly after the poet's death. The Okularnicy Foundation promotes Osiecka’s work, runs the Poet's Archive, organizes the annual singing competition  "Let us Remember Agnieszka Osiecka“, manages the Internet archive and publishes books.

To honour her creative output and her work at the National Polish Radio, the Music Studio was named after Osiecka in 1997.

In 2013, the National Bank of Poland (NBP) issued two commemorative coins (2 and 10-zloty denominations) as part of the "History of Polish popular music" series honouring Osiecka.

In 2020, the Polish public broadcaster Telewizja Polska released an eponymous biographical mini-series chronicling the life and work of Osiecka. It was directed by Robert Gliński and Michał Rosa and stars Eliza Rycembel and Magdalena Popławska as the titular character.

State honours
Commander's Cross with Star of the Order of Polonia Restituta (posthumously, 1997) 
Gold Cross of Merit (1979)

See also
List of poets

External links
 
 
 The Agnieszka Osiecka Internet Archive
 Profile of Agnieszka Osiecka at Culture.pl

References 

1936 births
1997 deaths
Burials at Powązki Cemetery
Łódź Film School alumni
Lyricists
Polish songwriters
Polish people of Romanian descent
Polish people of Serbian descent
Polish people of Hungarian descent
20th-century Polish poets
Deaths from colorectal cancer
Deaths from cancer in Poland
People associated with the magazine "Kultura"